Viljandi linnastaadion is a multi-purpose stadium in Viljandi, Estonia.  It is used mostly for football matches and hosts the matches of Viljandi JK Tulevik.  The stadium has 1,068 seats of which 386 are under the roof.

History
The building of the stadium started in 1928, when the mayor of Viljandi was August Maramaa. Because of the downturn in economy, the building was not completed before World War II.

Previous renovation before 2009 was done in the beginning of the 1980s.

Estonia national team matches 
Viljandi has hosted three Estonia national football team matches.

References

External links

Football venues in Estonia
Sport in Viljandi
Multi-purpose stadiums in Estonia
1928 establishments in Estonia
Sports venues completed in 1928
Buildings and structures in Viljandi County
Athletics (track and field) venues in Estonia